Ralph Lauren Corporation is an American publicly traded fashion company that was founded in 1967 by American fashion designer Ralph Lauren. The company is headquartered in New York City, producing products ranging from the mid-range to the luxury segments. They are known for marketing and distributing products in four categories: apparel, home, accessories, and fragrances. The company's brands include the mid-range Chaps brand, to the sub-premium Lauren Ralph Lauren brand, to the premium Polo Ralph Lauren, Double RL, Ralph Lauren Childrenswear, and Denim & Supply Ralph Lauren brands, up to the full luxury Ralph Lauren Purple Label and Ralph Lauren Collection brands. Ralph Lauren licenses its name and branding to Luxottica for eyewear; L'Oréal for fragrances and cosmetics; Hanesbrands for underwear and sleepwear; Kohl's and Hollander Sleep Products for bedding; Designers Guild for fabric and wallpaper; and EJ Victor for home furniture.

History

Ralph Lauren was one of several design leaders raised in the Jewish community in the Bronx, along with Calvin Klein and Robert Denning.

Lauren started The Ralph Lauren Corporation in 1967 with men's ties. At 28 years-old, Lauren worked for the tie manufacturer Beau Brummell. He persuaded the company's president to let him start his own line.  Drawing on his interests in sports, Lauren named his first full line of menswear "Polo" in 1968. He worked out of a single "drawer" from a showroom in the Empire State Building and made deliveries to stores himself.

By 1969, the Manhattan department store Bloomingdale's sold Lauren's men line exclusively. It was the first time that Bloomingdale's had given a designer his own in-store shop. In 1971, Ralph Lauren Corporation launched a line of tailored shirts for women, introducing the Polo player emblem on the shirt cuff. The first full women's collection was launched the following year.

1972 marked the opening of Ralph Lauren's store on Rodeo Drive in Beverly Hills, California, his first freestanding store. In 1972, Lauren released a short-sleeve cotton shirt in 24 colors. This design, emblazoned with the company's famed logo—that of a polo player, became the brand's signature look. In 1977 Ralph Lauren Corporation introduced a signature cotton mesh polo shirt in various colours, featuring the polo player logo on the chest.

In 1974, Ralph Lauren outfitted the male cast of The Great Gatsby in costumes chosen from his Polo line - a 1920s-style series of men's suits and sweaters, except for the pink suit which Lauren designed especially for Robert Redford’s Jay Gatsby. In 1977, Diane Keaton and Woody Allen wore Lauren's clothes in the Oscar-winning film, Annie Hall.

In 1978, the first Ralph Lauren fragrances, produced by Warner-Lauren, Ltd were launched at Bloomingdale's. Lauren for women, and Polo the men's cologne. This was the first time that a designer introduced two fragrances – one for men and one for women – simultaneously.

The company entered the European market and went international in 1981 with the opening of the first freestanding store in New Bond Street in the West End of London, England.  Lauren opened his first flagship in the Rhinelander mansion on Madison Avenue and 72nd Street in New York City in 1986. On June 12, 1997, the company becomes a publicly traded company on the New York Stock Exchange.

The 98-seat restaurant, RL, opened in March 1999 in Chicago adjacent to its largest and world flagship Ralph Lauren store at the corner of Chicago and Michigan Avenues on the Magnificent Mile. It was followed by the opening of two additional restaurants – Ralph's at 173 Boulevard Saint Germain Paris store in 2010 and The Polo Bar at Polo's store in New York in 2015.

The company launched its website and online shop in 2000 as polo.com by RL Media (a cooperation between Ralph Lauren and NBC). In 2007, Ralph Lauren Corporation acquired the NBC share of RL Media and the website was relaunched as ralphlauren.com. In September 2015, it was announced that Stefan Larsson would replace the company's founder, Ralph Lauren, as CEO in November. Lauren stayed on as executive chairman and chief creative officer.

In February 2017, it was announced that Larsson had agreed to leave his position as CEO effective May 1, 2017 due to differences with Lauren. On May 17, 2017, Ralph Lauren named Patrice Louvet President and Chief Executive Officer. Louvet most recently served as Group President, Global Beauty at Procter & Gamble (P&G). He took over on July 17, 2017.

In October 2020, Ralph Lauren Corporation announced that it would transition its Chaps brand to a fully licensed business model to focus on its core brands, reduce its direct exposure to the North American department store channel, and setting up the Chaps brand to be nurtured with an experienced partner. Also in October, Ralph Lauren Corporation has appointed former Obama administration consultant Valerie Jarrett to the board of directors.

In May 2021, Ralph Lauren Corporation announced it would sell its Club Monaco brand to private equity firm Regent LP.

Brands

 Ralph Lauren Women's Collection and Ralph Lauren Purple Label: Ralph Lauren Collection for women, launched in 1971, ranges from handmade evening gowns to sportswear. Launched in 1994, Ralph Lauren Purple Label for men offers suiting, custom tailored made-to-measure suits and sportswear, as well as benchmade footwear and made-to-order dress furnishings, accessories, and luggage.
 Ralph Lauren Watches and Fine Jewelry: In 2009 Ralph Lauren, together with luxury group Compagnie Financière Richemont SA, launched a collection of timepieces through the Ralph Lauren Watch & Jewelry Co. In 2010, the Ralph Lauren Watch & Jewelry Co. also introduced collections of jewelry.
 Ralph by Ralph Lauren: Launched in 1994, Ralph by Ralph Lauren offers suit separates, sport coats, vests, and topcoats.
 Polo Ralph Lauren: Men's Polo, Ralph Lauren's first complete line of sportswear and tailored clothing launched in 1967. In 2014, Women's Polo was launched.
 Polo Sport: Polo Sport launched in 1992, a line of activewear for sports and fitness. In 2014, Ralph Lauren debuted the PoloTech Shirt, which featured smart fabric technology that supposedly "captures robust biometrics from the wearer".
 Double RL: Founded in 1993 and named after Ralph Lauren and his wife Ricky's “RRL” ranch in Colorado, RRL offers men a mix of selvage denim, vintage apparel, sportswear and accessories, with roots in workwear and military gear.
 Lauren Ralph Lauren: Lauren for Women launched in 1996, offering sportswear, denim, dresses, activewear, and accessories and footwear at a cheaper price point. Lauren for Men offers men's tailored clothing, including suits, sport coats, dress shirts, dress pants, tuxedos, topcoats, and ties at a cheaper price point. This brand generally slots above Chaps in price, but below Polo Ralph Lauren.
 Polo Golf and RLX Golf: Polo Golf launched in 1990 and RLX Golf launched in 1998.
 Pink Pony: Established in 2000, a percentage of sales from all Pink Pony products benefit the Pink Pony Fund and other major cancer charities around the world. Pink Pony primarily consists of  women's sportswear and accessories. All Pink Pony items feature a pink Polo Player.
 Polo Ralph Lauren Children: Items include polo knit shirts and cashmere cable sweaters.
 Denim & Supply Ralph Lauren: The Denim & Supply Ralph Lauren line launched in 2011, inspired by the warehouse and artist communities of Brooklyn, New York, and authentic style found in the music festival scene. Denim & Supply was discontinued in September 2016.
 Chaps: A mid-range brand featuring men's casual sportswear. The brand previously also offered women's clothing until it was discontinued in early 2022. The Chaps brand is available primarily at Belk, Boscov's, Hudson's Bay and Meijer  stores (and until the end of 2021, Kohl's stores), and is priced to compete with Authentic Brands Group's/Centric Brands' Izod brand. The brand can also occasionally be found at several off-price stores such as Ross, T.J. Maxx, Macy's Backstage, and Nordstrom Rack. Since Fall 2021 the brand has also been available at Walmart. The brand is currently licensed to O5 Apparel.
 American Living: Ralph Lauren launched American Living for men and women in 2008, a mid-range lifestyle brand created exclusively for JCPenney. This line was comparable to the Chaps line, but was marketed as a more exclusive line, unlike Chaps which is sold at multiple retailers. This line was discontinued in 2012 due to poor sales.  A second American Living line was sold at Macy's; this American Living line only included women's clothing and was discontinued in 2019.
 Ralph Lauren Home and Paint: Ralph Lauren Home, the first complete home collection from an American clothing designer, makes its debut in 1983 with home furnishings and accessories. Ralph Lauren Home includes furniture, bed and bath linens, china, crystal, silver, decorative accessories and gifts, as well as lighting, fabric, wall covering, and floor covering. Ralph Lauren launched Paint in 1995, now with over 400 palettes.
 Fragrance: In 1978, Ralph Lauren launched his first fragrances: Lauren for women and Polo for men. Originally produced by Warner-Lauren, Ltd, L’Oréal now produces the Ralph Lauren Fragrances for men and women, including World of Polo (Polo, Polo Blue, Polo Black, Polo Red), Ralph Lauren Romance, Midnight Romance and the Big Pony Collections For Women and For Men.
 Ralph Lauren Restaurants: RL Restaurant Chicago opened in 1999, adjacent to its largest Ralph Lauren flagship store in the world on Michigan Avenue along the Magnificent Mile. In 2010, Ralph's was opened in the courtyard and converted stables at 173 Boulevard Saint Germain Paris flagship store. In August 2014, Ralph's Coffee opened on the second floor of the Polo Flagship store in New York City. The Polo Bar, adjacent to the New York City Polo Flagship store, opened in January 2015.

Stores

The Company ended Fiscal 2016 with 493 directly operated stores: 144 Ralph Lauren stores, 77 Club Monaco stores and 272 Polo factory stores. The company also operated 583 concession shop locations worldwide at the end of the year.

In addition to Company-operated locations, international licensing partners operated 93 Ralph Lauren stores and 42 dedicated shops, as well as 133 Club Monaco stores and shops at the end of Fiscal 2016.

Ralph Lauren operates its representative flagship stores in New York City on Madison Avenue – for menswear in the former Rhinelander Mansion, and for womenswear and home in another structure, across the street, which opened in 2010. The company also manages flagships, for retailing Ralph Lauren collections, in Chicago, Manhasset, Greenwich (USA), London, Milan, Tokyo, Moscow, Kyiv and Paris.

Sports sponsorships

USTA

In 2005, The United States Tennis Association selects Ralph Lauren Corporation as the official apparel sponsor for the U.S. Open. As part of the partnership, all on-court ball persons and officials were dressed in specially-designed Ralph Lauren apparel. This was Polo's first tennis sponsorship.

Wimbledon

In 2006, Ralph Lauren Corporation became the official outfitter of Wimbledon. Lauren is the first designer in the tennis tournament's history to be chosen to create uniforms for all on-court officials.

Australian Open

In 2020, Ralph Lauren Corporation became the official outfitter of the Australian Open.

U.S. Olympic Team
Ralph Lauren Corporation is the exclusive Official Parade Outfitter for the U.S. Olympic and Paralympic Teams, with the right to manufacture, distribute, advertise, promote, and sell products in the U.S. which replicate the Parade Outfits and associated leisure wear. The company has established a partnership with athletes serving as brand ambassadors and as the faces of the advertising, marketing, and public relations campaigns.

Ralph Lauren Corporation partners with the United States Olympic Committee to become an Official Outfitter of the U.S. Olympic Team, for the 2008 Summer Olympics in Beijing, 2010 Winter Olympics in Vancouver, 2012 Summer Olympics in London, 2014 Winter Olympics in Sochi and 2016 Summer Olympics in Rio.

Ralph Lauren designs the official Opening Ceremony and Closing Ceremony parade outfits for the U.S. teams in addition to an assortment of village-wear apparel and accessories.

Previously, the corporation received negative press when it was found to have sourced the clothing it supplied to the 2012 athletes from China, so it vowed to source everything it produced for the 2014 Olympics from the US. Kraemer Textiles Inc. spun around 6,000 pounds of Merino wool yarn from Imperial Stock Ranch in Oregon, which was then sent to Longview Yarns in North Carolina to be dyed. The clothing assembly was completed by Ball of Cotton in California. Ultimately, 40 American vendors were involved with production.

Leadership 

 Executive Chairman: Ralph Lauren (since 1967)
 Chief Executive Officer: Patrice Louvet (since 2017)

Former chief executives 

 Ralph Lauren (1967–2015)
 Stefan Larsson (2015–2017)

Philanthropy
In 1989, it co-founded the Nina Hyde Center for Breast Cancer Research at Georgetown University Hospital in Washington D.C. in memory of the late Post fashion correspondent.

In 1994, Ralph Lauren acted as chairman and creates the name and symbol for Fashion Targets Breast Cancer, a charitable initiative of the CFDA that marshals the goodwill and services of the fashion industry to raise public awareness and funds for breast cancer internationally.

In 2000, Ralph Lauren Corporation launched its Volunteer Program, which energises employees and creates meaningful connections with the communities in which they work.

On September 15, 2000, Ralph Lauren Corporation launched the Pink Pony Campaign, a national initiative to reduce disparities in cancer care by raising awareness as well as enhancing prevention, screening, and treatment in poor and underserved communities.

In 2001, the Polo Ralph Lauren Foundation established the American Heroes Fund following September 11 to allow Polo's 10,000 employees worldwide, as well as their customers, the opportunity to participate in the relief effort.

In 2003, Ralph Lauren established the Ralph Lauren Center for Cancer Care and Prevention in Harlem. The center is a collaboration between Ralph Lauren, Memorial Sloan-Kettering, and North General Hospital in Harlem, New York City.

In 2004, the Polo Fashion School was established, in which company executives work with inner-city youth to offer insights into the fashion business.

Established in 2006, the Polo Jeans G.I.V.E. (Get Involved Volunteer Exceed) campaign was created to inspire and encourage community service through volunteerism by supporting the efforts of dedicated volunteers and their causes.

In 2008, the Star-Spangled Banner, the original 1813 flag that inspired Francis Scott Key to write the National Anthem, was preserved by a $10 million contribution to Save America's Treasures from Polo Ralph Lauren in 1998. The flag was then unveiled on Wednesday, November 19, 2008, in a new gallery at the Smithsonian National Museum of American History, in Washington D.C.

In July 2013, Ralph Lauren Corporation announced its commitment to restore the elite École des Beaux-Arts in Paris, one of the most influential art schools in France.

In 2014, Ralph Lauren Corporation partnered with The Royal Marsden NHS Foundation Trust, the largest and most comprehensive cancer center in Europe, to develop a world-class breast cancer research facility. In 2016, Ralph Lauren Corporation opened the Royal Marsden Ralph Lauren Center for Breast Cancer Research.

In March 2020, Ralph Lauren Corporation donated $10m and started making isolation gowns and medical masks to support the COVID-19 fight.

In May 2022, The Ralph Lauren Foundation announced $25 million worth of commitments to fund, expand or establish five Ralph Lauren cancer centers. The commitment will benefit institutions with a National Cancer institute (NCI) designation, including Georgetown Lombardi Comprehensive Cancer Center, the Memorial Sloan Kettering (MSK) ralph Lauren Center and three additional locations.

Controversy

Levi Strauss lawsuit
Levi Strauss & Co. filed a lawsuit against Abercrombie & Fitch and the RL Corporation in July 2007 for trademark infringement. It alleged that the separate retailers used Levi's trademarked pocket design of connected arches in the design of some of their respective products.

South African Polo trademark issues
The Polo brand sold in South Africa is not affiliated with the Ralph Lauren brand. An independent South African company trademarked the Polo name and logo in South Africa.

Filippa Hamilton photo controversy
In 2009, Ralph Lauren apologized for digitally retouching a photograph of model Filippa Hamilton to make her look thinner. Hamilton also claims that she was fired by the company a few days later.

Accusations of intellectual property violation by Cowichan Tribes
After branding the sale of sweaters online as "Cowichan", it was reported that Cowichan Tribes would take "steps to communicate with Ralph Lauren and ensure that our product and name is protected". A petition through Change.org was set up to encourage Ralph Lauren to take action. This resulted in the product line being taken out of circulation and all mention of the name was removed from the Ralph Lauren website; there have been no further complaints from the Cowichan Tribe since.

Howard Smith 
In March 2022, Howard Smith, Ralph Lauren Corp.'s chief commercial officer, resigned after a board investigation found that his actions had breached the company's code of conduct. The apparel said it “learned of concerns about Mr. Smith's personal behavior recently”, and the board of directors' audit committee initiated an independent investigation with the help of outside counsel. The firm didn't go into detail about the claims but said the inquiry found that Mr. Smith's actions broke the company's code of conduct and ethics and that his resignation was required.

See also

Tom Ford
Perry Ellis
Geoffrey Beene
Bill Blass
Billy Reid
Joseph Abboud

References

External links

Ralph Lauren – consumer website
Ralph Lauren – corporate website

Clothing brands of the United States
Clothing retailers of the United States
Design companies of the United States
High fashion brands
Shoe companies of the United States
Suit makers
Swimwear brands
American companies established in 1967
Clothing companies established in 1967
Design companies established in 1967
1967 establishments in New York City
L'Oréal
Lauren family
Shops in New York City
Companies listed on the New York Stock Exchange
1970s fashion
1980s fashion
1990s fashion
2000s fashion
2010s fashion
Publicly traded companies based in New York City
Commercial buildings in Manhattan
Eyewear brands of the United States
1997 initial public offerings